Mirka Velinovska is a Macedonian journalist.

Biography
Velinovska was born in Skopje on 23 April 1952. Graduated from Faculty of Philosophy - History of Art, studied Oriental Studies in Belgrade and classic English at Cambridge University. Since 1980 Cultural editing the MRT, and the following year in the internal political rubric of "Vecer." In the period 1990/98 was confirmed the commentator as the weekly "Puls". One of the founders of the weekly "Start" in 1999 and the weekly magazine "Zum". She is a freelance journalist in the leading political weekly "Focus", now "Nova Makedonija". Collaborated with Deutsche Welle, "Search for Ground" and the Institute for War and Peace Reporting in London.

Awards
18 June 2016 Decoration for merit in the fight against Fascism awarded by HE Ambassador of the Russian Federation in Macedonia Mr. Oleg Shcherbak

Television appearances

See also
Vasko Eftov

References

Macedonian journalists
Writers from Skopje
1952 births
Living people